Shakti Singh (born 14 May 1962) is an Indian discus thrower and shot putter.

His personal best shot put is 20.60 metres, achieved in July 2000 in Bangalore. His personal best discus throw is 61.72 metres, achieved in June 1994 in Bangalore.

Competition record

References 

1962 births
Living people
Indian male discus throwers
Indian male shot putters
Athletes (track and field) at the 1996 Summer Olympics
Athletes (track and field) at the 2000 Summer Olympics
Olympic athletes of India
Recipients of the Arjuna Award
Asian Games medalists in athletics (track and field)
Athletes (track and field) at the 1994 Asian Games
Athletes (track and field) at the 1998 Asian Games
Athletes (track and field) at the 2002 Asian Games
Place of birth missing (living people)
Asian Games silver medalists for India
Asian Games bronze medalists for India
Medalists at the 1998 Asian Games
Medalists at the 2002 Asian Games